Nuevo Continente was a passenger airline based in Lima, Peru, operating scheduled domestic and international flights out of Jorge Chavez International Airport.

History 

The airline was founded by Fernando Zevallos in  1992 as Aero Continente. Flight operations were launched on 25 May of that year, initially on regional chartered routes on behalf of Occidental Petroleum, a US-based oil and gas company. Scheduled domestic passenger services commenced on 20 July 1993, using a fleet of just two aircraft: a Boeing 727-100 and a Boeing 737-200. At that time, the Peruvian airline market was dominated by Faucett and Aeroperú. Aero Continente competed with these airlines by offering extremely low ticket fares.

When Faucett and Aéroperu both went bankrupt in 1999 due to financial difficulties, Aero Continente acquired a monopoly position as the only airline operating on domestic routes in the country. By that time, the fleet size had been increased to approximately 30 aircraft, mainly of the 737 type, though larger aircraft like the Lockheed L-1011 TriStar were also used. During that period, international routes were launched, the first ones connecting Lima with Panama City and Santiago de Chile. This coincided with the foundation of Aero Continente Chile, a wholly owned subsidiary aiming at the Chile domestic market using a fleet of five Boeing 737-200 aircraft handed down from its parent.

During the 1990s, the safety reputation of the Peruvian airline industry became a public concern after a series of high-profile accidents; especially Faucett's crash in Arequipa and Aeroperú Flight 603, both in 1996. In August of that year, the US Embassy in Lima issued a ban on their employees from flying in Aero Continente due to reported issues with their engines, and advised caution to US citizens flying in Peru's airlines, to the point of providing a hotline and a web portal to help tourists know if a certain airline was considered unsafe.

In late 1999, Aero Continente was granted approval to operate on the prestigious Lima to Miami route. For this purpose, a Boeing 757-200 had been leased from Air 2000. After half a year, the leasing contract was terminated. The Miami route was henceforth offered by Aero Continente Chile from Santiago with a stopover at Lima with a Boeing 767-200 aircraft. By 2001, the combined international network of the Lima and Santiago based companies had grown to include Buenos Aires, Bogotá, La Paz, Caracas, Guayaquil and Santa Cruz de la Sierra.

In 2002, the company suffered a setback when Chilean authorities arrested several staff members of Aero Continente Chile over drug trafficking allegations, which forced the airline to cease all flight operations. As a consequence, the Chilean subsidiary was re-integrated into mainline Aero Continente, which claimed the grounding had been rather motivated by concerns that the company had become too strong a competitor for LAN Airlines, the Chilean flag carrier.

Aero Continente Dominicana, a second wholly owned subsidiary based in Santo Domingo, had been founded in late 2001. This short-lived business adventure lasted only roughly one year, operating a limited number of flights from the Dominican Republic to Miami. In 2003, after the Dominican subsidiary had failed, Aero Continente itself opened a small base Santo Domingo Airport, offering VFR flights to the Hispanic population centers in New York City, Los Angeles and Madrid.

In 2004, though, Aero Continente had its approval to operate into the United States withdrawn by the Office of Foreign Assets Control of the United States Treasury, as its founder and key person, Fernando Zervallos, had been included in a list of the ten most wanted crime bosses of the illegal drug trade (Specially Designated Nationals). Thus, Aero Continente lost its insurance protection, as Global Aerospace, a partly US-based company that was responsible for this matter, was forced to cease its involvement with the airline. It was also unable to buy spare parts for its mostly US-built fleet. Consequently, all flight operations were ceased on 12 July of that year.

In a comeback effort, the company reacted by changing its ownership structure and adopting the new name Nuevo Continente, but could not get rid of the allegations that it was involved in criminal activities. In 2005, Nuevo Continente had its airline licence revoked by the Peruvian authorities, officially due to safety concerns.

Fleet 
Over the years, Aero Continente (respectively Nuevo Continente) operated the following aircraft types:

Destinations

Domestic
 Lima (Hub)
 Cusco
 Arequipa
 Juanjuí
 Juliaca
 Trujillo
 Chiclayo
 Piura
 Cajamarca 
 Chachapoyas
 Pucallpa
 Moyobamba
 Tarapoto
 Tacna
 Andoas
 Iquitos
 Yurimaguas
 Ayacucho

International
 Panama City-Tocumen
 Santiago de Chile 
 Arica
 Iquique
 Antofagasta
 Puerto Montt
 Balmaceda
 Punta Arenas
 Miami
 La Paz
 Santa Cruz de la Sierra-Viru Viru
 Port-au-Prince
 Buenos Aires-Ezeiza
 Córdoba
 Guayaquil
 Quito (Old Airport)
 Caracas
 Bogotá
 Frankfurt
 Madrid
 Santo Domingo-Las Américas

 Berlin-Schönefeld

Accidents and incidents 
In 1996, the airline became the center of a scandal after it became known that two teenagers rode in the cockpit of a flight from Lima to Tarapoto, after being instructed to do so by the flight attendants due to overbooking. This act was a flagrant violation of international air safety standards. 
On 13 December 2003 at 22:48 local time, the Boeing 737-200 (registered OB-1544-P) operating Aero Continente Flight 341 from Caracas to Lima belly-landed at Jorge Chavez International Airport because the pilots had forgotten about lowering the landing gear since they had to cope with a problem concerning the flaps. The aircraft was damaged beyond repair, but all 94 passengers and six crew on board survived the accident.

References

External links 
 

Defunct airlines of Peru
Airlines established in 1992
Airlines disestablished in 2005